Special prosecutor may refer to:

Special counsel, United States
Special prosecutor (Canada)